Lung Ying-tai (born 13 February 1952 in Kaohsiung) is a Taiwanese essayist and cultural critic. She occasionally writes under the pen name 'Hu Meili'. Lung's poignant and critical essays contributed to the democratization of Taiwan and as the only Taiwanese writer with a column in major mainland Chinese newspapers, she is a writer in Mainland China. Described as a "public intellectual of the Chinese-speaking world", she spent 20 years based outside Taiwan in the US and Germany where became widely known for her criticism of the Kuomintang's martial law regime. She has since become a critic of Mainland China's increasing restrictions on press freedom and civil liberties. She has written more than 30 books.

Lung Ying-tai has held two positions within Taiwan's government as Taipei's first Cultural Bureau Chief (1999–2003) and as Taiwan's first Culture Minister (2012–2014).

Early life

Lung's father, Lung Huai-sheng, a Kuomintang military police officer, fled Hunan and moved his family to Taiwan after the KMT lost the Chinese Civil War in 1949. Born in Kaohsiung, she grew up in poverty; she said her family "lost everything", most importantly its social and family networks. She is her parents' second child and has four brothers. The first character of Lung's given name, ying, is her mother's family name ( Ying Mei-jun), and the second character, tai, is to signify that she is the first child in the family to be born in Taiwan.

After attending National Tainan Girls' Senior High School, Lung received her bachelor's degree in Foreign Language and Literature from the National Cheng Kung University and a PhD from Kansas State University in English and American Literature.

Early career

After returning to Taiwan, she began writing an op-ed column in the China Times on various conditions in Taiwan. Her essays were published together in 1985 in a book of sociopolitical criticism, Ye Huo Ji (野火集, The Wild Fire), when Taiwan was still under the Kuomintang's one-party rule, and this book "was seen as influential in the democratization of the island." In 21 days, the book went through 24 printings and made such a huge impression that it was compared to a "hurricane" by poet Yu Guangzhong (the word in Chinese, longjuan feng, was a pun on Lung's name). She moved to Germany in 1987, partly due to the response to her work that included death threats. Her translated essays had appeared in European newspapers such as the Frankfurter Allgemeine Zeitung. Her work has appeared in mainland Chinese newspapers since the early 1990s. Her books include Haizi Ni Manman Lai (孩子你慢慢來, 1994, Children, Take Your Time), Yinse Xianrenzhang (銀色仙人掌：龍應台小說集, 2003, Silver Cactus: Stories), Bainian Sisuo (百年思索, 1999, A Century of Thought) and in 2006, Qing Yong Wenming Lai Shuifu Wo (請用文明來說服我, 2006, Please Use Civilization to Convince Me), an open letter to Hu Jintao following the temporary closure of Freezing Point. She criticised Singaporean minister Lee Kuan Yew and the government's restrictions on personal freedom in 1994 in an article titled, "Thank God I Am Not Singaporean" (幸好我不是新加坡人).

She returned to Taiwan to become the first Director of the Cultural Affairs Bureau of Taipei in September 1999, and her policies increased the visibility of the arts in Taipei during her four-year term. She resigned in March 2003 to return to writing, noting that "being an official is suffocating. I could hardly breathe."

She was a visiting professor at the Journalism and Media Studies Centre of the University of Hong Kong from 2004 to 2006. In July 2005, she established the Lung Ying-tai Cultural Foundation and used the foundation as a platform to sponsor literary and artistic endeavours as well as academic lectures. In 2007, Lung was offered a position on the seat on the Control Yuan which she refused. Since 2008 Lung Ying-tai has undertaken the position of Hung Leung Hao Ling Distinguished Fellow in Humanities of University of Hong Kong and Chair Professor of National Tsing Hua University in Taiwan. She received the 2009 K.T. Li Chair Professor Award from NCKU.

In 2008, her book Mu Song (目送, Watching You Go) was published, becoming popular across Asia. The book is a collection of 74 works of prose narrating hardships and obstacles Lung has encountered, particularly in relation to her family.

Her 2009 book Da Jiang Da Hai 1949 (大江大海一九四九, Big River, Big Sea 1949) is about the Chinese Civil War and the Kuomintang's retreat to Taiwan. It sold over 100,000 copies in Taiwan and 10,000 in Hong Kong in its first month of release, but discussion of her work was banned in mainland China following the book launch. In 2019, during the pro-democracy protests in Hong Kong, Lung wrote in a Facebook post that the protestors were "a small chicken's egg" confronting "a wall of iron and steel". In response, the People's Daily accused her of ignoring the "violent rioters" and attacked the "narrowness of her thinking".

Upon the creation of the Ministry of Culture in May 2012 she became the first Minister of Culture of Taiwan.

Minister of Culture

Lung was inaugurated as Minister of Culture on 21 May 2012, stating a desire that the ministry be independent of political influence. During her 2-year, 7-month tenure, she made statements or announced initiatives on reading, TV culture, and cross-strait exchanges. On 1 December 2014, Lung tendered her resignation from the ministerial post citing her aging mother as the main reason, with political and media hostility as contributing factors. (Note: this was one of several resignations that happened in late November / early December 2014 immediately after the local elections.)

Personal life

After moving to Germany in the late 1980s, she married a German man with whom she has two sons. She was also known as Ying-tai Walther. They were eventually divorced. One of Lung's books, Dear Andreas (《親愛的安德烈》), is a collection of letters and e-mails between her and her older son.

References

External links

Lung Ying-tai page at National Tsing Hua University 
(Live-webcast) Professor Lung Ying-tai's New Book Launch & Lecture

1952 births
Living people
Writers from Kaohsiung
Taiwanese academics
National Cheng Kung University alumni
Kansas State University alumni
Politicians of the Republic of China on Taiwan from Kaohsiung
Taiwanese expatriates in Hong Kong
Academic staff of the University of Hong Kong
People with acquired permanent residency of Hong Kong
Taiwanese Ministers of Culture
Women government ministers of Taiwan